Raghuvaṃśa is a Sanskrit epic poem by Kalidasa.

Raghuvamsha may also refer to:
 Raghuvaṃśa (dynasty), named after Raghu
 Raghuvamsham (film), a 1978 film

See also
 Raghuvamsha Sudha, a popular kriti in Carnatic music